Clement Wing Hong Lam is a Canadian mathematician, specializing in combinatorics. He is famous for the computer proof, with Larry Thiel and S. Swiercz, of the nonexistence of a finite projective plane of order 10.

Lam earned his PhD in 1974 under Herbert Ryser at Caltech with thesis Rational G-Circulants Satisfying the Matrix Equation . He is a professor at Concordia University in Montreal.

In 2006 he received the Euler medal. In 1992 he received the Lester Randolph Ford Award for the article The search for a finite projective plane of order 10. The eponymous Lam's problem is equivalent to finding a finite projective plane of order 10 or finding 9 orthogonal Latin squares of order 10.

See also
Experimental mathematics

References

External links
 Homepage
 search on author CWH Lam from Google Scholar

Canadian mathematicians
Combinatorialists
California Institute of Technology alumni
Academic staff of Concordia University
Living people
Year of birth missing (living people)
Place of birth missing (living people)